is a private university with campuses in Moriguchi, Osaka and Hirakata, Osaka, Japan. The predecessor of the school was founded in 1929, and it was chartered as a university in 1988.

Education
This university has following faculties and schools

 Faculty of Business Administration and Economics
 Department of Business Administration
 Department of Economics
 Faculty of International Liberal Arts
 Department of International Communication
 Department of International Tourism
 Faculty of Human Sciences
 Department of Psychology and Communication
 Department of Health Science
 Department of Sports Science
 Graduate Studies

Notable alumni 
Mari Amimoto, wheelchair basketball player
Jason Storr, Author

References

External links
 Official website

Educational institutions established in 1929
Private universities and colleges in Japan
Universities and colleges in Osaka Prefecture
1929 establishments in Japan
Kansai Collegiate American Football League
Moriguchi, Osaka
Hirakata, Osaka